St Luke's is a parish of the Episcopal Church in downtown Long Beach, California. A member of the Episcopal Diocese of Los Angeles, St Luke's has a historic reputation for upholding progressive social ideals and serving the community. The Church is a registered historic building on the corner of 7th Street and Atlantic Avenue. In 2001, Father Gary Commins left Holy Faith Episcopal Church in Inglewood to serve as St. Luke's Senior Rector. Rev. Anna Olson, a former Community Organizer, was the Associate Rector beginning in 2008. In January 2016, Rev. Ricardo Avila took the position of Interim Rector when Rev. Gary Commins stepped down.

Construction and Architecture 
Located at 525 E. 7th St. in the City of Long Beach, St. Luke's Episcopal Church has been a center of religious, social and cultural activities in Long Beach since a church was first built on this site in 1917. After being destroyed by the 1933 earthquake, the rebuilding of the church in the English Gothic Revival style demonstrated the commitment of church leaders in the face of disaster. The Reverend Perry G.M. Austin, rector of the church during this time, mobilized nationwide support for the rebuilding of the church. Famous donors included Eleanor Roosevelt, J. P. Morgan, Felix duPont, Judge Augustus Hand and Senator Walter G. McAdoo. The cornerstone for the rebuilding was laid on March 19, 1934, just a year and nine days after the earthquake.

LGBT Advocacy 
St Luke's is a well known advocate of GLBT issues in Southern California. Every year, as a part of Long Beach's pride parade, St Luke's holds a Mass on the bluffs above the ocean worship service to help kick off the event. In October 2010, in the wake of a wave of LGBT suicides brought on by harassment, St Luke's held a community-wide Coming Out Celebration. The event promoted an inclusive theology, meant to reassure the LGBT community that they have Christian support.

Illegal Immigration Controversy 
In 2007 St Luke's made national headlines by providing sanctuary, in the face of strong governmental and outside pressure, to an illegal immigrant hoping to keep her children in America. St. Luke's has been a notable face of the New Sanctuary Movement. As a part of this movement, congregations maintain that the immigration system mistreats immigrants and breaks families apart. They seek to end raids of job sites that have led to the arrest of thousands of undocumented workers, and lobby for policies that would help keep the families of illegal immigrants together in the United States.

References

External links

Churches in Long Beach, California
Episcopal church buildings in California
Churches completed in 1933
20th-century Episcopal church buildings
Religious organizations established in 1897
1897 establishments in California
Gothic Revival church buildings in California